Scott Wilson (born William Delano Wilson; March 29, 1942 –  October 6, 2018) was an American actor. He had more than 50 film credits, including In the Heat of the Night, In Cold Blood, The Great Gatsby, Dead Man Walking, Pearl Harbor, and Junebug. In 1980, Wilson received a Golden Globe nomination for Best Supporting Actor – Motion Picture for his role in William Peter Blatty's The Ninth Configuration. He played veterinarian Hershel Greene on the AMC television series The Walking Dead (2011–2014; 2018). He also had a recurring role on CSI: Crime Scene Investigation as casino mogul Sam Braun, as well as a lead role on the Netflix series The OA as Abel Johnson.

Life and career

Wilson was born in the small Southern town of Thomasville, Georgia. He made his screen debut portraying characters suspected of murder in his first three films. In his debut film, Wilson played a murder suspect in In the Heat of the Night (1967). Wilson appeared in Sparta, Illinois where (In the Heat of the Night) takes place, on March 15, 2014, to celebrate the city's 175th anniversary in reference to his debut appearance in the film.

His follow-up role, in the same year, was in the film version of In Cold Blood, based on the book of the same name by Truman Capote. Wilson portrayed real-life murderer Richard Hickock, while Robert Blake played his partner, Perry Smith.

Director Richard Brooks cast Wilson and Blake in the starring roles specifically because they were unknown at the time. The director passed over better-known actors, including Steve McQueen and Paul Newman, for the parts. Wilson later explained Brooks' casting motivations: "Brooks hired two 'unknowns' and he wanted to keep it that way. We were treated like two killers he had somehow run across."

The film earned Wilson an appearance on the cover of Life magazine, published on May 12, 1967. Wilson was just 25 years old at the time. The cover features Truman Capote standing between Wilson and Blake on an empty highway in Kansas. The caption, Nightmare Revisited, appears with them on the cover. Wilson appeared in The Great Gatsby in 1974 opposite Robert Redford. He received a 1980 Golden Globe nomination for Best Supporting Actor for his performance in The Ninth Configuration by director and friend William Peter Blatty. He lost the Golden Globe to Timothy Hutton. In 1995 Wilson got attention for his role as a prison chaplain in Dead Man Walking, starring Susan Sarandon and Sean Penn, based on the book of the same name by Sister Helen Prejean.

Wilson's long filmography also includes The Gypsy Moths, The Right Stuff, A Year of the Quiet Sun, Malone, The Grass Harp, Junebug, The Host, Monster, Young Guns II, Pearl Harbor, Big Stan, Judge Dredd, the Shiloh film series and Behind the Mask: The Rise of Leslie Vernon. Wilson has filmed on location in South Korea, Japan and Spain. Wilson had a recurring role in several episodes of CSI: Crime Scene Investigation as Sam Braun, father of crime-scene investigator Catherine Willows (portrayed by Marg Helgenberger). Braun was killed off in the episode "Built to Kill, Part 2". In the fall of 2011 he also made an appearance opposite Laura Dern in the HBO series, Enlightened.

Wilson was cast as veterinarian, Hershel Greene in the second season of The Walking Dead in June 2011. The role has earned him positive reviews, including a "cheer" from TV Guide, which wrote that he had contributed "subtle shades of humanity to the character of Hershel Greene." Wilson was offered the opportunity to join the show while visiting his 97-year-old mother in Georgia. He has described his mother as "a fan of the show." Wilson left the show in December 2013 after his character was killed off in the season 4 mid-season finale "Too Far Gone". However, he made two guest appearances since his character's death, and made his last onscreen appearance in the fifth episode of the ninth season of The Walking Dead.

Wilson reflected on his career in a 2011 interview with Access Atlanta's Rodney Ho: "It's been up and down. It's always been. You have dry spells. At different times, you are starting over. If you love it, you stay with it. That's what I'm doing. I've accomplished more than I would have hoped to have accomplished. I don't want to be a big movie star. I can be someone who walks the streets and not get mobbed. I want to be as fine an actor as I can be. I am still striving to be as good as I can be." Wilson was filming scenes for The Walking Dead in Senoia, Georgia, at the time the interview took place. In 2014, Wilson was cast in a recurring role as Dr. Guyot in the Amazon original series Bosch. In 2016, he appeared in the Netflix series The OA.

Personal life
He married Heavenly Koh Wilson in 1977.

Death
On October 6, 2018, Wilson died from leukemia at his home in Los Angeles, aged 76. He died just a few hours after NYCC (New York Comic Con). The premiere episode of The Walking Deads ninth season, "A New Beginning", which aired the next day, was dedicated to Wilson's memory which is shown in the final credits of the episode.

Filmography

Film

Television

Other awards and nominations

References

External links

Scott Wilson (Aveleyman)
Scott Wilson at Find a Grave

1942 births
2018 deaths
20th-century American male actors
21st-century American male actors
American male film actors
American male television actors
Male actors from Atlanta
People from Thomasville, Georgia
Deaths from leukemia
Deaths from cancer in California
Burials at Forest Lawn Memorial Park (Hollywood Hills)
American people of British descent